Lincoln is an unincorporated community in central Lee County, Texas, United States.  It lies along Highway 21 north of the city of Giddings, the county seat of Lee County.  Its elevation is 371 feet (113 m).  Although Lincoln is unincorporated, it has a post office, with the ZIP code of 78948.

Lincoln was formerly named Evergreen.  Evergreen was the home town of the infamous American Old West gunfighter Bill Longley.

References

Unincorporated communities in Lee County, Texas
Unincorporated communities in Texas

It's on highway 21 not highway 77.